William Waldorf Astor III, 4th Viscount Astor (born 27 December 1951) is an English businessman and politician who sits as a Conservative hereditary Lord Temporal in the House of Lords. He is a member of the Astor family, which is known for its prominence in business, society, and politics in both the United States and the United Kingdom.

Biography
Astor was a Lord-in-waiting (a House of Lords whip) from 1990 to 1993. He was then made a Parliamentary Under Secretary of State at the Department of Social Security. In 1994, he moved to the Department of National Heritage where he served until leaving the government in 1995.

He was a member of the Founding Council of the Rothermere American Institute at the University of Oxford.

Viscount Astor is Chairman of Silvergate Media and director of Networkers Plc (since 2007) and trustee of Stanley Spencer Gallery in Cookham.

Political positions 
Astor was an early opponent of the HS2 high-speed rail project.

Marriage and children
Astor married Annabel Lucy Veronica Jones (born 1948), daughter of Timothy Angus Jones and Patricia David Pandora Clifford on 14 January 1976. They have three children:

 Hon Flora Katherine Astor (born 7 June 1976). She is married to Theo Rycroft. They have three children: Nelson (born 2008), Pandora (born 2011) and Lydia (born 2016).
 Hon William Waldorf "Will" Astor IV (born 18 January 1979). He is married to Lohralee Stutz. They have four children: William Waldorf (born 2012), Allegra Annabel (born 2013), Conrad Charles (born 2016) and India Isabel (born 2017).
 Hon James Jacob "Jake" Astor (born 4 March 1981). He is married to Victoria L. Hargreaves. They have two children: Sibyl (born 2015) and Atalanta (born 2017).

The heir to the viscountcy is his elder son, Will.

His wife Annabel's stepfather was his uncle Michael Langhorne Astor.

Viscountess Astor was previously married to Sir Reginald Sheffield, 8th Baronet by whom she is the mother of Samantha Cameron, wife of former Prime Minister David Cameron.

Arms

References

External links

1951 births
Living people
William
Livingston family
Conservative Party (UK) Baronesses- and Lords-in-Waiting
People educated at Eton College
Viscounts Astor
Hereditary peers elected under the House of Lords Act 1999